Patricia Kippax (23 September 1941 – 17 August 2009) was a British sprinter. She competed in the women's 400 metres at the 1964 Summer Olympics.

References

1941 births
2009 deaths
Athletes (track and field) at the 1964 Summer Olympics
British female sprinters
Olympic athletes of Great Britain
Place of birth missing
Olympic female sprinters